"Shake a Tail Feather" is a song written by Otha Hayes, Verlie Rice, and Andre Williams and originally recorded in 1963 by the Chicago-based group the Five Du-Tones. The original recording reached #28 on Billboards Hot R&B Singles chart and #51 on the Hot 100.

Background
The song references a number of dance styles/moves including the Boogaloo, The Twist, The fly, The Bird, Monkey, the Mashed Potato, the duck and the Watusi.

Notable cover versions
"Shake a Tail Feather" has been covered by many other artists over the years:
In 1966, Tommy James and the Shondells included it on their debut album, Hanky Panky.
A 1967 version by James & Bobby Purify reached #25 on the Billboard Hot 100.
 Ike & Tina Turner recorded their version in 1968 for their album So Fine. It is also performed in the movie about their lives, What's Love Got To Do With It.
Ray Charles covered and performed the song during his scenes in the 1980 film The Blues Brothers where he was surrounded by dancers performing the move referenced in the song whilst he himself played a Rhodes piano and sang.

References

Songs written by Andre Williams
1963 songs
1963 singles
1967 singles
The Five Du-Tones songs
James & Bobby Purify songs
Ray Charles songs
The Blues Brothers songs
Tommy James and the Shondells songs
Bell Records singles